Ede-Oballa is a suburban area of Nsukka located south of the main town. 
Ede-Oballa is made up of three autonomous communities, Ede-Ukwu, Ede-Enu and Owerre Ede-Oballa with their traditional rulers. Each of the communities has villages and each of the villages is headed by a village head known as Onyishi. Ede-Oballa is located in Nsukka local government area. The town is bounded by Opi (archaeological site), Eha-alumona, Lejja and Nru Nsukka.

References

External links
https://www.igboguide.org/HT-maps.htm
https://web.archive.org/web/20161017122222/http://www.enugustate.gov.ng/about-enugustate/

Populated places in Enugu State